Kawama may refer to:
Kawama Airport in Matanzas Province, Cuba
also a channel, district and hotel in Varadero, Cuba
Kawama Station in Noda, Chiba, Japan
Kazusa-Kawama Station in Ichihara, Chiba, Japan
Otoro language, also known as Kawama

See also

Loggerhead sea turtle, also known as ¨caguama¨